Oremandsgaard  is a manor house and estate located seven kilometres south of Præstø, Vordingborg Municipality, in southeastern Denmark. The estate traces its history back to the 14th century, but the current main building is from 1933. Oremandsgaard was acquired by  Alfred Hage in 1861 and is currently owned by the fifth generation of the Hage family. It is one of the oldest organic farms in Denmark and plays host to an annual chamber music festival.

History

Early history
Oremandsgaard is first mentioned in a letter of 1356, in which one "Pæther Bekære" cedes all his farms and the village of Gedhærudh (Gederød) to Valdemar IV. It is unclear whether the estate was continuously owned by the crown over the next centuries until it was included in one of the 12 new cavalry districts by the crown in 1721. It is believed that the main building was destroyed during the Dano-Swedish War in 1658–1660 due to finds of rubble and weapons in the surrounding fields and also because this was the case for nearby Jungshoved.

1651–1861: Changing owners
 
Oremandsgaard and Jungshoved were sold by the crown in 1761, when the cavalry district on Falster was dissolved. The buyer was Henrik Brockenhuus, a friend of Frederick IV. Shortly thereafter he also acquired the much larger Nysø Manor. All three estates belonged to the same owners until 1795.   In 1785, they were acquired by Niels Lunde Reiersen. In 1775 he had founded a successful trading house in a partnership with Frédéric de Coninck, trading both in the East Indies and on the Guinea Coast. When he died in 1795, unmarried and childless, his estate was passed on to a foundation named Det Reiersenske Fond. Oremandsgaard was sold in 1796. It was later divided into the estates Ny Oremandsgaard and Gammel Oremandsgaard. In 1846, it was passed on to Peter Collet, a secretary in the Ministry of Foreign Affairs in Stockholm.

1861–present: The Hage family
 
In 1861, Alfred Hage purchased Oremandsgaard. It comprised Ny Oremandsgaard, Gammel Oremandsgaard, Allerslev Church and 139 tenant farms. He demolished the existing buildings and constructed a new main building on the Ny Oremandsgaard estate.

 
Alfred Hage and his wife Vilhelmine Faber took many initiatives that benefitted the community and were held in high regards by the locals. Their son,  Alfred Peter Anton Hage, began to sell the tenant farms to the farmers towards the end of the century. The last tenant farms were not sold until 1919, making Oremandsgaard one of the last estates in Denmark to have tenant farms. Alfred Peter Anton Hage, like his parents, engaged in charitable work among the farmers on his estate, providing economic support for the sick, poor and children and establishing a public library.

Daniel Hage took over the estate at the age of 25 in 1963. He became a pioneer of organic farming in Denmark.

Today
The Oremandsgaard estate also comprises 20 other buildings that are rented out.

The Oremandsgaard  estate covers 788 hectares of land (2011) of which 420 hectares are farmland and 362 hectares is covered by woodland. It is one of the oldest organically farmed estates in Denmark.

Chamber music festival
Oremandsgaard has played host to an annual chamber music festival. It takes place in late July, lasts for a week and features young promising chamber musicians from Denmark and abroad.

Oremandsgaard Destillery
Oremandsgaards Destilleri, a distillery, was established on the estate in 2019.

List of owners
 (1330–1356)  Peder Bekere
 (1356–1761)  The Crown
 (1761–1785)  Henrik Brockenhuus
 (1785–1795)  Niels Lunde Reiersen
 (1796–1803)  Hans Petersen
 (1803–1824)  Peter Benedikt Petersen
 (1824–1827)  Peter Nicolaj Arbo
 (1827–1846)  Anne Cathrine Arbo née Collett
 (1846–1860)  Peter Anker Collet
 (1861–1872)  Alfred Hage
 (1872–1919)  Alfred Peter Anton Hage
 (1919–1947)  Christoffer Friedenreich Hage
 (1947–1963)  Thyra Hage née Konow
 (1963–2013)  Daniel Friedenreich Hage
 (2013– )  August Friedenreich Hage

References

External links

 Official website
 Oremandsgaard at Slotsferie Danmark

Manor houses in Vordingborg Municipality
Historicist architecture in Denmark
Organic farming in Denmark
Buildings and structures associated with the Hage family